Jaime Sáenz Guzmán (8 October 1921 – 16 August 1986) was a Bolivian writer, poet, novelist, journalist, essayist, illustrator, dramaturge, and professor, known best for his narrative and poetic works. His poetry, though individual to the point of being difficult to classify, bears some similarities with surrealist literature.

He was born, lived, and died in the city of La Paz, which would come to be the setting permanently in the background of each of his works. He is recognized as one of the most important authors in Bolivian literature, as both his life and his work prominently highlighted 20th century Bolivian culture. There are a number of academic studies on his work, as well as translations in English, Italian, and German.

Throughout his life, Sáenz struggled with alcoholism, a struggle which he frequently wrote about in his poems. Accordingly, he is often viewed as a poète maudit or "cursed poet". Sáenz was openly, "unashamedly" bisexual.

Biography 

Sáenz was born on 8 October 1921 in La Paz, Bolivia. His father was Genaro Sáenz Rivero, the lieutenant colonel of the Bolivian Army, and his mother Graciela Guzmán Lazarte. His humanistic and artistic formation began in La Paz, being sent to the Muñoz School in 1926 for primary school, and then to the American Institute of La Paz for secondary, which he finished in 1937.

In 1938, he traveled to Germany with some classmates and cadets from the Military School of Bolivia. This trip to Europe greatly affected the direction of his work, as he was strongly influenced by the works of philosophers Arthur Schopenhauer, Hegel, Martin Heidegger, and writers Thomas Mann, William Blake, and Franz Kafka; as for his music tastes, Sáenz enjoyed Richard Wagner and Anton Bruckner.

In 1939 he returned to Bolivia and in 1941 he started to work in the Bolivian Department of Defense, then in the Bolivian Treasury. In 1942, he joined the United States Information Service (USIS) at the U.S. Embassy in La Paz. Two years later, he married a German citizen, Erika Käseberg, and in 1947 they had a daughter named Jourlaine. In 1948, due to Sáenz's relapses into dipsomania, Erika left Sáenz and returned to Germany with their daughter. In 1944, he published the first volume of his magazine . In 1952 he left his job at the USIS. In 1955 he published  (The Scalpel) and in 1957  (Death by Touch). Around then he also published  (Anniversary of a Vision) (1960),  (Immanent Visitor) (1964), and the first volume of his magazine  (1965). In 1967 he published  (The Cold), and the Arca Gallery exhibited his illustrations of skulls, of which there were various.

In 1967 he befriended Carlos Alfredo Rivera, with whom he shared a very close friendship, so much so that it is said Sáenz was the only one who paid attention to Dr. Rivera. And for that same reason, Rivera forbade him to drink. Sáenz began following that order, but died after a few weeks due to two crises of delerium tremens.

Sáenz and his professorship 

In 1970 he earned a professorship in Bolivian Literature with a dissertation on Alcides Arguedas at the Universidad Mayor de San Andrés (UMSA) in La Paz. In 1974, he presented a theatrical play called  (Friday Night) and a libretto for his opera  (Lost Traveler).

With the support of scholars, and invited by some students, Sáenz opened a Poetry Workshop in the Literature Program of the UMSA in 1978. That same year, he published  (Images from La Paz).

A notable exhibition was of his work  (Skulls), in which he presented about twenty pictures, including:  (Skull that Resisted Being a Skull),  (Skull with Toothache),  (Skull in Showcase),  (Malnourished Skull),  (Skull in Misfortune),  (Dead Man's Skull), among other skulls done in indigenous styles.

The Krupp Workshops 

Nighttime reunions with Jaime Sáenz were hosted for years, and until the moment of his death they were a space for the marginalized and the rebellious to have rich intellectual exchange. The famous "Krupp Workshop", the venue where Sáenz received his visitors, was converted into an institution, where the publication of literary magazines, games of dice, music by Anton Bruckner or Simeón Roncal, chats about Milarepa, and lectures on poetry were the permanent foundation.

Influence 

One can say that very few representatives of Bolivian literature, music, or contemporary art have stopped having a connection with or influence from Sáenz. Even the new generation of videographers and filmmakers have felt the importance of his work.

Perhaps the most appealing detail about him, especially to young people, was the romantic aspect of his lifestyle, reflected in his work schedule and social life: sleep during the day and live at night.

Sáenz, alcohol, and his death 

Fascination with death was something experiential for Sáenz. Like he himself reports in his most autobiographical book,  (The Lodestone) (1989), visiting the morgue to contemplate the dead was one of the extravagant activities he participated in as a youth. But one should not see this as a necrophilic act, but as an obsession to understand life and death as a unity, which he came to call " (True Life)".

Sáenz claimed to have reached true life, which is also access to the transcendental conscience that he aspired to have.
"While alive, the man will not be able to understand the world; the man ignores that as long he does not stop living, he will not be wise". [...] "What does living have to do with life; living is one thing and life is another thing, life and death are one and the same".
The impact of alcohol is greatly explored in two works: the poem  (The Night) (1984) and the novel Felipe Delgado (1979). Sáenz denied many times that this novel was autobiographical in nature, but one cannot fail to see some aspects of his personal life within it, especially the references to his time as an alcoholic.

His voluntary renunciation of alcohol, which took place sometime in the 1960s, was one of his greatest achievements of his life. Save for sporadic relapses, Sáenz did not go back to drinking until just before his death in 1986. The years where he was distanced from alcohol were when he was most productive.

Sáenz died in La Paz on 16 August 1986, surrounded by his dearest friends and colleagues. He was buried the next day in the city's General Cemetery.

Homages 

In La Paz, a street in the Cota Cota neighborhood is named after Jaime Sáenz. A plaza in the macrodistrict San Antonio is also named in his memory, and is near the Jaime Saenz Cultural District House.

Works

Poetry books 

 (1955) 
 (1957) 
 (1957) 
 (1960) 
 (1964) ; English Translation: Immanent Visitor: Selected poems of Jaime Saenz (2002)
 (1967)  English Translation: The Cold (2015)
 (1973)  (anthology)
 (1978) Bruckner
 (1978) 
 (1982) 
 (1984) ; English Translation: The Night (2007)

Short stories 

 (1972) 
 (1979) 
 (1985) 
 (1986)  (posthumous)
 (1989)  (posthumous)
 (1996)  (posthumous compilation)
 
 
 
 (2009)  (posthumous)

Novels 

 (1979) Felipe Delgado
 (1991)

Theatre 

 (2005)  (posthumous compilation)

Visual art 

 (2005)  (posthumous compilation)

Collections of Sáenz's work 
It is worth noting that Sáenz never re-released his own works. These collections were compiled and published with no connection to Sáenz himself. The copyright status of many of these works is vague.
 (1975) Plural Editores, 
 (2000) 
 (2004) 
 (2005) 
 (2007) 
 (2008) 
 (2011) 
 (2015)

See also 

Bolivian literature

References

External links 

 Jaime Saenz at University of Oregon

1921 births
1986 deaths
Bolivian novelists
Bolivian poets
Bolivian educators
Spanish-language writers
Spanish-language poets
Bolivian LGBT people
Bolivian LGBT writers
People from La Paz
Writers from La Paz
Bolivian theatre people
Bolivian short story writers
Higher University of San Andrés alumni
20th-century Bolivian artists
20th-century Bolivian writers
20th-century Bolivian poets
20th-century LGBT people
Bolivian male writers
Bolivian male poets
Bisexual men